SVB Financial Group (SVB or SVBFG) is a financial services holding company headquartered in Santa Clara, California. The company's main business unit was commercial bank Silicon Valley Bank, until the bank failed in March 2023 after a bank run. The company was a member of the S&P 500 index until March 15, 2023. According to public filings, as of December 31, 2022, SVB Financial Group had 164 subsidiaries.

The company is composed of two divisions: SVB Capital, a venture capital and investment management subsidiary of SVBFG, and SVB Securities, an investment bank subsidiary of SVBFG. SVB Capital manages $ in funds of both clients and the bank that was invested in venture capital funds. SVB Securities provides investment services to clients especially in the technology, healthcare, and life science industries. A third division, SVB Private was a private banking service affiliated with Silicon Valley Bank that, along with its affiliates SVB Investment Services and SVB Wealth, offered client services especially catered to private equity and high-net-worth individuals; it is now in receivership along with Silicon Valley Bank.

History
SVB Financial was founded as Silicon Valley Bancshares on April 23, 1982, by Bill Biggerstaff and Robert Medearis over a poker game. Silicon Valley Bank was incorporated as a wholly-owned subsidiary in October 17, 1983.

In 1988, the company went public via an initial public offering, raising $6 million.

The company's stock price soared through the dot-com bubble but fell 50% when the bubble burst. The company reincorporated as a Delaware corporation in 1999. Ken Wilcox became CEO in 2000

In 2001, the company's investment banking arm, SVB Securities, expanded its business with a $100 million acquisition of Palo Alto Alliant Partners, which was rebranded SVB Alliant. In 2002, it formally entered the private banking business, building on prior experience and relationships with wealthy venture capitalists and entrepreneurs.

On May 31, 2005, Silicon Valley Bankshares rebranded as SVB Financial Group, signaling the company's diversification away from commercial banking. SVB Alliant ceased operations in 2007.

In December 2008, SVB Financial received a $235 million investment from the U.S. Treasury through the Troubled Asset Relief Program. The U.S. Treasury received $10 million in dividends from SVB Financial and, in December 2009, the company repurchased the outstanding stock and warrants held by the government, funding this through a stock sale of $300 million.

In 2015, CEO Greg Becker indicated that SVB had yet to make immediate plans to re-enter the investment banking sector as it had before 2006.

In January 2019, SVB Financial acquired Leerink Partners LLC, and renamed the business SVB Leerink. In 2021, SVB acquired Boston Private Financial Holdings and merged its subsidiary Boston Private Bank & Trust Company into Silicon Valley Bank and SVB Private. In 2022, SVB acquired media and telecom research company MoffettNathanson. In February 2022, SVB Leerink was rebranded as SVB Securities.

In March 2023, Silicon Valley Bank experienced a bank run and collapsed. The failure of Silicon Valley Bank was the largest of any bank since the 2007–2008 financial crisis by assets, and the second-largest in U.S. history behind that of Washington Mutual. On March 10, 2023, the California Department of Financial Protection and Innovation closed SVB, Santa Clara, and appointed the FDIC as receiver, which transferred all the bank's assets to a newly-established bridge bank. The holding company was not included in the bank closing or resulting receivership. It is no longer affiliated with either Silicon Valley Bank or SVB Private.

On March 13, 2023, SVB Financial Group began exploring a potential sale of the bank's sister companies SVB Capital and SVB Securities. The latter's founder, Jeffrey Leerink, has expressed interest in buying back the firm. However, the finances of these companies are deeply intertwined with Silicon Valley Bank, which could complicate any sale. The company filed Chapter 11 bankruptcy on March 17, one week after the bank's failure. A group including Centerbridge Partners, Davidson Kempner Capital Management, and PIMCO reportedly bought a stake in the company in anticipation of the bankruptcy.

References

External links
 
 Investor relations website

1980s initial public offerings
1982 establishments in California
American companies established in 1982
Companies based in Santa Clara, California
Companies formerly listed on the Nasdaq
Companies that filed for Chapter 11 bankruptcy in 2023
Financial services companies established in 1982
Holding companies established in 1982
Holding companies of the United States